Baptists at Our Barbecue is a 2004 comedy film based on the 1996 novel of the same name by Robert Farrell Smith. It was directed, and produced by Christian Vuissa. This film features some the Church of Jesus Christ of Latter-day Saints (LDS Church)-centric humor that is meant to appeal to Mormon audiences that non-LDS people are unlikely to get, as well as some humor aimed at non-Mormon audiences.

Plot
"Baptists at Our Barbecue" is the story of the small town of Longwinded, Arizona, USA, a divided, feuding town of 262 Mormons and 262 Baptists. It's also a story about one man who will try anything to end the ridiculous feud and bring the town together, and keep the peace-loving girl of his dreams from leaving town.

Main cast

 Dan Merkley as Tartan
 Heather Beers as Charity
 Jan Broberg Felt as Tartan's Mom
 Dane Stephens as Sheriff Bob
 Frank Gerrish as Brother Hatch
 Tony Larimer as Pastor Stevens

Soundtrack

 "New Emotion" – Ryan Shupe & the Rubberband 
 "Miracle" – Jamen Brooks 
 "Lucia" – The Court & Spark 
 "A Thousand Miles" – Angela Pace 
 "Long Old Time" – Micah Dahl Anderson 
 "Ghosts Are Good Company" – Bishop Allen 
 "Grew Young" – Sweethaven 
 "Quarry Anthem" – Big Smith 
 "Women Thoughts" – Greg Duckwitz 
 "Head Up the Mountain" – Jamen Brooks 
 "O Sister, There Thou Art" – Micah Dahl Anderson 
 "Stretch On, Road" – Night In Wyoming 
 "The Calm Before the Storm" – Greg Duckwitz 
 "Hallelujah II" – The Court & Spark 
 "If" – The Happies 
 "Perfectly Complicated" – Tiffany Fronk 
 "Let's Have a Barbecue!" – Matt Mattson

References

External links
 
 Collection of articles on the film Baptists at Our Barbecue

2004 comedy films
2004 films
Mormon cinema
Films directed by Christian Vuissa
Halestorm Entertainment films
2000s English-language films